Thaumatodon hystricelloides is a species of minute air-breathing land snail, a terrestrial pulmonate gastropod mollusk in the family Endodontidae.

This species is endemic to Samoa; it is an endangered species.

References

Endodontidae
Gastropods described in 1865
Taxonomy articles created by Polbot